Soccer Bowl '76 was the championship final of the 1976 NASL season, between the Toronto Metros-Croatia and the Minnesota Kicks.  The match was played on August 28, 1976 at the Kingdome, in Seattle, Washington. The Toronto Metros-Croatia won the match, 3–0, to claim their first North American championship.

Background

Toronto Metros-Croatia
The Toronto Metros-Croatia qualified for the playoffs by virtue of a second-place finish in the Northern Division with 123 points. Toronto defeated the Rochester Lancers in a first round match, 2–1, on August 18, 1976. Two days later in the conference semifinals they played the Northern Division champion Chicago Sting to a 2–2 draw, and advanced on penalties, 3–1. In the Atlantic Conference finals the Metros-Croatia upset the defending champion Tampa Bay Rowdies, 2–0, on August 24, 1976, to advance to the Soccer Bowl.

Minnesota Kicks
The Minnesota Kicks qualified for the playoffs by virtue of winning the Western Division with 138 points. The point total earned them the number one seed in the Pacific Conference and with it, a first round playoff bye. The Kicks defeated the Seattle Sounders in the conference semifinals, 3–0, on August 21, 1976. Four days later they downed the Southern Division champion San Jose Earthquakes, 3–1, in the Pacific Conference finals played on August 25, 1975, to advance to the Soccer Bowl.

Match details 

1976 NASL Champions: Toronto Metros-Croatia 

Television: CBS, CBC
Announcers: Jon Miller

Statistics

See also 
 1976 North American Soccer League season

References 

1976
 
1976 in Canadian soccer
1976
August 1976 sports events in the United States
1976 in sports in Washington (state)
Soccer in Seattle
Sports competitions in Seattle